Real Unión de Tenerife is a Spanish football team based in Santa Cruz de Tenerife, in the autonomous community of Canary Islands. Founded in 1915, it plays in the Interinsular Pref. de Tenerife Group 2 league, which is one of 5 leagues that make up Group 12 of the Tercera División RFEF. It plays its home matches at Estadio La Salud, with a 2,500-seat capacity.

Season to season

3 seasons in  Tercera División
 Seasons in  Preferente: 26
 Seasons in  Primera Regional: 9

Honours

Campeonato de las Islas Canarias (1): 1977.
Copa de Canarias (1): 1948.
Copa Heliodoro Rodríguez López (7): 1949/50, 1954/55, 1956/57, 1958/59, 1959/60, 1961/62, 1990/91.
Trofeo Teide (1): 1972.
Torneo de San Ginés (1): 1955.

References

External links

Escudos del club

Football clubs in the Canary Islands
Association football clubs established in 1915
Sport in Santa Cruz de Tenerife
1915 establishments in Spain